Notre Dame Academy (NDA) is a Roman Catholic secondary school for girls in Patna, India, in the Roman Catholic Archdiocese of Patna, serving girls in grades 1–12.  It is affiliated to CBSE board.

History
The first Notre Dame School in India was founded in Jamalpur, Bihar in 1950. The Notre Dame Academy, Patna was founded on 2 February 1960, under control of the Patna Notre Dame Sister's Society by Sister St. Thomas SND, Sister Mary Freda and Sister Sushila. It is associated with the Roman Catholic Archdiocese of Patna.

The society was founded in 1804 by St. Julie Billiart (1751–1816) as Congregation of the Sisters of Notre Dame de Namur in France. From there the Congregation of the Sisters of Notre Dame was formed in Coesfeld, Germany, in 1850, from where the mission spread, offering educational, social and medical services.

Today, it is a girls' school in the city, with an emphasis on extracurricular activities along with studies. It has a Montessori section which allows co-education. The school is associated with SPIC MACAY programs.

It supports Julie School, a school system for the poor who cannot afford to pay for their education. Notre Dame celebrated its Golden Jubilee in 2009.

Administration
 Principal – Sister Neha SND
Headmistress – Sister Mary Rosemary SND
 Director – Sister Mary Tresa SND

Motto
"Lead Me From Darkness To Light".

Notable alumni
Neetu Chandra
Pranati Rai Prakash

See also
 Pustak Mahal

References

External links
website
School location

Private schools in Bihar
Christian schools in Bihar
Catholic secondary schools in India
Girls' schools in Bihar
Schools in Patna
Educational institutions established in 1960
1960 establishments in Bihar
Sisters of Notre Dame de Namur schools